Pribrezhny is a rural locality (a settlement) in Novooskolsky District, Belgorod Oblast, Russia. The population was 1,168 as of 2010. There are 9 streets.

Geography 
Pribrezhny is located 2 km southwest of Novy Oskol (the district's administrative centre) by road. Novy Oskol is the nearest rural locality.

References 

Rural localities in Novooskolsky District

Renamed localities of Belgorod Oblast